William Bullard may refer to:

 William H. G. Bullard (1866–1927), United States Navy admiral
 William Bullard (Dedham) (1594–1686), early resident in Dedham, Massachusetts
 William R. Bullard (1926–1972), American archaeologist
 Bill Bullard Jr. (1943–2020), Michigan politician